Archie and Me was a comic book title published by Archie comics from 1964 to 1987. Most issues and covers focused on the interaction of Archie Andrews and the school principal, Mr. Weatherbee.  This suggests that Mr. Weatherbee is the "Me" mentioned in the title, whereas the "Me" in Reggie and Me and Betty and Me appeared to refer to Archie Andrews himself.

See also
 List of Archie Comics Publications

Comics magazines published in the United States
Archie Comics titles
1964 comics debuts
1987 comics endings
Teen comedy comics
Humor comics
Romantic comedy comics
Magazines established in 1964
Magazines disestablished in 1987
Bimonthly magazines published in the United States
Defunct American comics